Belmore, an electoral district of the Legislative Assembly in the Australian state of New South Wales was created in 1904 and abolished in 1920.


Election results

Elections in the 1910s

1917

1913

1910

1910 by-election

Elections in the 1900s

1907

1904

Notes

References 

New South Wales state electoral results by district